is a Japanese former figure skater. She is the 2011 Golden Spin of Zagreb silver medalist.

Programs

Competitive highlights
JGP: Junior Grand Prix

References

External links 
 

Japanese female single skaters
1997 births
Living people
People from Yokohama